No. 455 Squadron was a Royal Australian Air Force (RAAF) torpedo bomber squadron during World War II and became famous as part of the "ANZAC Strike Wing" that was formed from Australian and New Zealand squadrons. Raised in early 1941, mainly from Australian personnel, the squadron served over Europe during the war, operating from various bases in the United Kingdom; it also briefly sent a detachment to the Soviet Union in 1942. Operating Handley Page Hampdens and Bristol Beaufighters, the squadron mainly undertook anti-shipping and anti-submarine operations during the war.  It was disbanded in May 1945 following the cessation of hostilities against Germany.

History
No. 455 Squadron was formed on 23 May 1941 as an Article XV squadron and officially raised at Williamtown, New South Wales. Established under the Empire Air Training Scheme, the squadron was formed for service in Europe with the Royal Air Force and although nominally an Australian squadron, its personnel were drawn from a number of Commonwealth countries including Britain, Canada, New Zealand and Rhodesia. While the main body waited to be shipped to the UK, other Commonwealth personnel, drawn mainly from the RAF, concentrated RAF Swinderby, in Lincolnshire and on 6 June 1941 the squadron was formally established.

The squadron received Hampden bombers and the bulk of the Australian personnel arrived on 1 September 1941, having departed Australia on 15 June. Initially assigned to No. 5 Group RAF, Bomber Command in a bomber role, its first operation took place while the squadron was still forming, when a single Hampden attacked Frankfurt at night on 29 August. In doing so, according to the Australian War Memorial, the squadron had the distinction of becoming the "first Australian squadron to bomb Germany". Following this, the squadron increased its operational tempo, undertaking several mine laying operations off the coast of occupied France, as well attacking industrial targets in Germany.

In February 1942, the squadron took part in an unsuccessful attack on the German battleships Scharnhorst and Gneisenau, before being re-roled as a torpedo-bomber squadron and transferred to RAF Coastal Command on 26 April 1942.

In Operation Orator, the squadron was deployed briefly to Vaenga airfield in the Soviet Union in September 1942. The detachment was to operate in support of convoys bound for Russia, which were at the time suffering heavy losses. However, three of the 16 Hamptons were lost prior to arrival, while after completing one anti-shipping sweep the remaining aircraft were handed over to the Soviet Air Force with the RAAF crews instructing the Soviets on their operation. Following the completion of this task the squadron returned to RAF Sumburgh in October, where they received replacement aircraft.

No. 455 Squadron continued to be employed in largely uneventful anti-shipping and anti-submarine patrols during this time. On 28 January 1943 seven aircraft from Nos. 455 and 487 Squadrons sank a 3,570-tonne merchant ship with torpedoes; while a 6,018-tonne merchantman was sunk near Egero Island on 12 May. Moving to RAF Leuchars in Scotland, the squadron was re-equipped with Beaufighters in October 1943 and operated against German shipping off Norway and in the Baltic Sea until the end of the war, forming the "Anzac Strike Wing" with No. 489 Squadron, Royal New Zealand Air Force. The squadron moved to RAF Langham in Norfolk in April 1944, subsequently providing flak suppression for No. 489 Squadron's torpedo carrying Beaufighters. Commencing operations on 6 May a number of enemy ships were attacked, successfully sinking one. During these operations the Australians faced heavy naval anti-aircraft fire as well as enemy fighters. Often attacking targets in narrow Norwegian fiords, they suffered heavy casualties.

In October 1944, the squadron moved to RAF Dallachy, in Scotland. On 8 November 1944 six No. 455 Squadron Beaufighters took part in an attack on German shipping in Midgulen Fiord, sinking two ships despite heavy anti-aircraft fire. Anti-shipping strikes continued into 1945, and saw the destruction of a number of vessels. The squadron moved to RAF Thornaby, from where they were involved in attacks on German shipping in the Baltic Sea. The squadron's final operation of the war was flown on 3 May 1945, when they attacked two German minesweepers in concert with New Zealand aircraft which sunk a tanker. No. 455 Squadron was disbanded on 25 May, while at Thornaby. Australian losses amongst the squadron's personnel during the war amounted to 91 killed. Between April 1942 and the end of the war, it was credited with sinking 18 vessels: one U-boat, 10 merchantmen, three escorts and four minesweepers.

Aircraft operated
No. 455 Squadron RAAF operated the following aircraft:

Squadron bases
No. 455 Squadron RAAF operated from the following bases and airfields:

Commanding officers

No. 455 Squadron was commanded by the following officers:

References

Notes

Bibliography

External links

 Australian War Memorial: 455 Squadron
 ADF-Serials 455 Sqn, RAAF Hampden page

Australian Article XV squadrons of World War II
Military units and formations established in 1941
Military units and formations disestablished in 1945
Australia–Soviet Union relations